Peter Ian Wilkinson (12 November 1934 – 19 October 1987) was a New Zealand politician of the National Party.

Wilkinson was born in Hexham, Northumberland, England, in 1934, the son of Rev G. L. B. Wilkinson. He received his education at schools in the Waikato and Auckland, at Durham University in England (from where he obtained a Bachelor of Arts with honours), and at the University of Auckland (from where he obtained a Bachelor of Laws).

In the 1978 election, Nevern McConachy of the Social Credit Party came within 520 votes of winning the electorate, the best chance that Social Credit had that election for gaining another representative; at the time, only Bruce Beetham was in Parliament for Social Credit. Wilkinson was succeeded in the Kaipara electorate by Lockwood Smith. Wilkinson was a Cabinet Minister, and held the position of Attorney-General in the Third National Government.

He was a half-brother of former Deputy Prime Minister Sir Jim McLay who succeeded him as the Attorney-General.

He died in Auckland Hospital of a brain haemorrhage, aged 52 years. He was survived by his wife, Cunitia Wilkinson. The Wilkinson Trophy road running race has been held annually at Kaipara. First awarded in 1973 by Wilkinson, his widow continues to financially support the race.

Notes

References

|-

|-

|-

|-

1934 births
1987 deaths
People from Hexham
English emigrants to New Zealand
Alumni of St Cuthbert's Society, Durham
University of Auckland alumni
20th-century New Zealand lawyers
New Zealand National Party MPs
Members of the Cabinet of New Zealand
Members of the New Zealand House of Representatives
New Zealand MPs for North Island electorates
Unsuccessful candidates in the 1966 New Zealand general election